Nicholas Yonge (also spelled Young, Younge; c. 1560 in Lewes, Sussex – buried 23 October 1619 in St Michael, Cornhill, London) was an English singer and publisher.  He is most famous for publishing the Musica transalpina (1588), a collection of Italian madrigals with their words translated into English. This proved to be explosively popular, beginning (or fueling) a vogue for madrigal composing and singing in England which lasted into the first two decades of the 17th century. Indeed, William Heather, founder of the music chair at Oxford University, included the book in his portrait, painted c. 1627, confirming the longevity of Musica transalpina's influence and popularity.

Musica transalpina contains 57 separate pieces by 18 composers, with Alfonso Ferrabosco the elder having the most, and Luca Marenzio second most. Ferrabosco was living in England until 1578, which could explain the large number of his compositions in the book; he was relatively unknown in Italy.

In 1597, Yonge published a second book (Musica transalpina:  the Second Booke of Madrigalles, ... translated out of Sundrie Italian Authors). Composers such as John Wilbye and Thomas Weelkes used the pieces in both collections as models for their work.

Notes

References

David Brown, "Nicholas Yonge".  The New Grove Dictionary of Music and Musicians, ed. Stanley Sadie.  20 vol.  London, Macmillan Publishers Ltd., 1980.  
Gustave Reese, Music in the Renaissance.  New York, W.W. Norton & Co., 1954.

External links

1560s births
1619 deaths
English male singers
16th-century English singers
17th-century English singers